Anthurium parambae is a species of plant in the family Araceae. It is endemic to Ecuador. It is threatened by habitat loss.

References

Endemic flora of Ecuador
parambae
Data deficient plants
Taxonomy articles created by Polbot